The Vietnam Cinema Association Awards, popularly known as the Kite Awards or Golden Kite Awards (Vietnamese: Giải thưởng Hội Điện ảnh Việt Nam, Giải Cánh diều or Cánh diều vàng) since 2003, is an annual awards ceremony, recognizing the excellence of Vietnamese films, television series and videos produced during a year in Vietnam. The ceremony is usually held early next year.

In spite of receiving a lot of criticism, this is still the most popular film and television awards in Vietnam.

History

In essence, Vietnam Cinema Association Awards is an internal awards in the award system of Literary Arts Association, which includes 7 associations: photography, architecture, cinema, music, theatre, literature, and art. In order to encourage the artists' works, every year, the government provides the funds to the associations to award them.

The Vietnam Film Association Awards was originally presented by the Association as an award within the framework of the Vietnam Film Festival. Since 1993, VCA officially separated from the Film Festival and organizes its own awards annually. The first awards ceremony was to consider awards for films released in the period 1991-1993.

In March 2003 on the 50th anniversary of the Vietnam Revolutionary Cinema (1953), VCA initiated the Golden Kite Prize, and combined with Vietnam Television station, broadcast the ceremony live with the support of the business through advertising. Since then, the Awards is held independently and usually called as Golden Kite Awards or Kite Awards. Along with Golden Kite, Silver Kite and Bronze Kite are also given, though some years they are removed.

Categories
Throughout the history of the awards, many categories have been changed. A prize can be given to numerous winners, or will not be given if the nominees are not good enough to achieve. Those listed below are the most current ones.

Film

Movies

Golden Kite Prize
Silver Kite Prize
Certificate of Merit
Best Director
Best Screenplay
Best Cinematography
Best Art Design
Best Original Score
Best Sound
Best Leading Actor
Best Leading Actress
Best Supporting Actor
Best Supporting Actress
Promising Actor/Actress

Documentary
Golden Kite Prize
Silver Kite Prize
Certificate of Merit
Best Director
Best Cinematography

Science
Golden Kite Prize
Silver Kite Prize
Certificate of Merit

Animated
Golden Kite Prize
Silver Kite Prize
Certificate of Merit
Best Director
Best Animator

Short Subject
Golden Kite Prize
Silver Kite Prize
Certificate of Merit

Television

Golden Kite Prize
Silver Kite Prize
Certificate of Merit
Best Director
Best Screenwriter
Best Cinematography
Best Leading Actor
Best Leading Actress
Best Supporting Actor
Best Supporting Actress
Promising Actor/Actress

Film Critic/Theory Research
Golden Kite Prize
Silver Kite Prize
Certificate of Merit

See also
Cinema of Vietnam

References

External links
Thế Giới Điện Ảnh Online – Official Vietnam Cinema Association Magazine 

Vietnamese film awards
Awards established in 2003
2003 establishments in Vietnam